Peter Eastman may refer to:

 Peter Eastman (software engineer), developer of the 3D graphics application "Art of Illusion"
 Peter Eastman (artist) (born 1976), South African painter, printmaker and jewellery designer

See also 
 Eastman (surname)